Federal College of Education, Iwo is a public institution in Osun State, Nigeria  authorized with issuance of National Certificate in Education (NCE) to successful graduating students.

Background 
Federal College of Education, Iwo was established in 2020 at Iwo, Osun State, by the administration of President Muhammadu Buhari. The college is among the 30 newly established higher institution learning established by the Buhari's administration since asming power In 2015. The pioneer Provost is Professor Rafiu Adebayo appointed in April 2021.

As part of the take off-plan, the federal government of Nigeria approved NGN 1.3 billion in the 2022 budget allocation to the college. In June 2021, the Paramount Ruler of Iwoland, Oba Abdulrosheed Adewale Akanbi presented the Certificate of Occupancy (C of O), to the management team on the permanent site of the institution.

The other principal officers include:

Dr. Adebayo Lasisi, Bursar

Mr. Aderibigbe, Registrar

Dr. Mrs Iyanda, College Librarian

Schools 
The institution offers several courses under the following schools:

School of Arts and Social Sciences

School of Education

School of Languages

School of Science

School of Vocational Studies

References 

Schools in Osun State
2020 establishments in Nigeria
Federal colleges of education in Nigeria
Educational institutions established in 2020